Nicole Melichar and Xu Yifan were the defending champions but Melichar chose not to participate. Xu partnered Yang Zhaoxuan, but they lost in the semifinals to Hayley Carter and Luisa Stefani.

Alexa Guarachi and Desirae Krawczyk won the title, defeating Carter and Stefani in the final, 6–7(4–7), 6–4, [10–3].

Seeds

Draw

Draw

References

 Main Draw

Adelaide International - Doubles
Adelaide International (tennis)
Adelaide